Pompadour may refer to:

 Madame de Pompadour (1721–1764), Jeanne-Antoinette Poisson, Marquise de Pompadour, mistress of King Louis XV
 Pompadour (hairstyle), a combed hairstyle that takes its name from Madame de Pompadour
 Pompadour fish (or discus), a genus of fish native to the Amazon river basin
 Arnac-Pompadour (or simply Pompadour), a commune of the Corrèze department of France
 Pompadour station, a railway station on the Nexon–Brive line
 The Pompadours, a nickname for the 56th (West Essex) Regiment of Foot
 A shade of pink
 A type of fabric produced by warp printing

See also
 Madame Pompadour (disambiguation)